Castigliano's method, named after Carlo Alberto Castigliano, is a method for determining the displacements of a linear-elastic system based on the partial derivatives  of the energy. He is known for his two theorems. The basic concept may be easy to understand by recalling that a change in energy is equal to the causing force times the resulting displacement. Therefore, the causing force is equal to the change in energy divided by the resulting displacement. Alternatively, the resulting displacement is equal to the change in energy divided by the causing force. Partial derivatives are needed to relate causing forces and resulting displacements to the change in energy. 
 Castigliano's first theorem – for forces in an elastic structure
Castigliano's method for calculating forces is an application of his first theorem, which states:
If the strain energy of an elastic structure can be expressed as a function of generalised displacement qi then the partial derivative of the strain energy with respect to generalised displacement gives the generalised force Qi.
In equation form,

where U is the strain energy.

If the force-displacement curve is nonlinear then the complementary strain energy needs to be used instead of strain energy. 

 Castigliano's second theorem – for displacements in a linearly elastic structure.
Castigliano's method for calculating displacements is an application of his second theorem, which states:
If the strain energy of a linearly elastic structure can be expressed as a function of generalised force Qi then the partial derivative of the strain energy with respect to generalised force gives the generalised displacement qi in the direction of Qi.

As above this can also be expressed as:

Examples
For a thin, straight cantilever beam with a load P at the end, the displacement  at the end can be found by Castigliano's second theorem :

The integral evaluates to:

The result is the standard formula given for cantilever beams under end loads.

External links
 Carlo Alberto Castigliano
 Castigliano's method: some examples

References

Structural analysis